LaTraia Jones (born February 11, 1956) is a former American football player and coach. He was the 13th head football coach at Mississippi Valley State University located in Itta Bena, Mississippi and he held that position for three seasons, from 1999 until 2001.  His coaching record at Mississippi Valley State was 5–28.

Playing career and education
Jones was a four-year letterman as a running back at the University of Wyoming from 1975 to 1978 and was the Cowboys all-time rushing leader with 2,031 yards.  He completed his bachelor's degree in 1986 at New Mexico State University in both Physical Education and Biology. He earned his master's degree in Educational Administration from NMSU in 1990.

Coaching career
During a game against Jackson State University on September 22, 2001, a fight broke out on the field between players of both schools. Jones was reprimanded for the incident and both schools were fined.  Jones finished the season at 0-11, a part of a fifteen-game losing streak and left the position after completing the season.

Head coaching record

References

1956 births
Living people
Alcorn State Braves football coaches
Arkansas–Pine Bluff Golden Lions football coaches
Mississippi Valley State Delta Devils football coaches
New Mexico State Aggies football coaches
Western New Mexico Mustangs football coaches
Wyoming Cowboys football players
New Mexico State University alumni
Players of American football from Houston
African-American coaches of American football
African-American players of American football
20th-century African-American sportspeople
21st-century African-American sportspeople